Martin Lesley Crandall (born April 20, 1975) is an American musician, multi-instrumentalist,  best known as a former member of The Shins. Crandall is originally from Albuquerque, New Mexico and spent some of his high school years in Las Vegas, Nevada (where he formed a band called Captain Go). He previously lived along with the rest of the band in Portland, Oregon. Crandall is featured extensively in Current TV documentary All Eyes on The Shins.

In 2008, Crandall was arrested for domestic violence charges with girlfriend, Elyse Sewell. The case was later dismissed. 

In 2009, Crandall was dismissed from The Shins along with Jesse Sandoval.

See also
James Mercer
Dave Hernandez
Jesse Sandoval
Elyse Sewell

References

External links
The Shins official website

Living people
1975 births
Guitarists from Oregon
Musicians from Albuquerque, New Mexico
The Shins members
21st-century American bass guitarists
21st-century American keyboardists